Jürgen Stock (born October 4, 1959) is a German police officer and academic. He has served as secretary general of Interpol since November 7, 2014.

Biography
Stock was born on October 4, 1959, in Wetzlar, Germany. He joined the Kriminalpolizei in Hesse in 1978 and stayed on as an officer until 1992. Between 1992 and 1996 he went to the University of Giessen to occupy himself with scientific research in criminology. In 1996 he worked as a lawyer, before returning to the Bundeskriminalamt to become the deputy head of a unit combating economic crime. Stock became President of the University of Applied Police Science located in Saxony-Anhalt in 1998.

In 2000 he returned once more to the Bundeskriminalamt to head the Institute of Law Enforcement Studies and Training. In 2004 he became Vice President of the Bundeskriminalamt.

He is also an Honorary Professor for Law and Criminology at the University of Giessen.

Interpol
Since 2005 Stock has worked for Interpol. He was Vice President of Europe at the organisation between 2007 and 2010. On November 7, 2014, he was elected Secretary General of Interpol by the General Assembly, he took over the position from Ronald Noble with immediate effect. He was elected for a five-year term. In October 2019, he was re-elected for a second five-year term.

References

External link

1959 births
Living people
People from Wetzlar
German police officers
Interpol officials
University of Giessen alumni